Reduction of Hours of Work (Glass-Bottle Works) Convention, 1935 (shelved) is  an International Labour Organization Convention.

It was established in 1935, with the preamble stating:
Considering that the question of the reduction of hours of work is the sixth item on the agenda of the Session;

Confirming the principle laid down in the Forty-Hour Week Convention, 1935, including the maintenance of the standard of living;

Having determined to give effect to this reduction forthwith in the case of glass-bottle works,...

Ratifications
Prior to it being shelved, the convention had been ratified by ten states.

References

External links 
Text.
Ratifications.

Shelved International Labour Organization conventions
History of glass
Working time
Treaties concluded in 1935
Treaties entered into force in 1938
Glass industry